Can't Get Enough is the third studio album by American R&B/disco singer Barry White, released on August 6, 1974 by the 20th Century label.

Release
The album topped the R&B albums chart, his third album to do so. It also topped the Billboard 200 and peaked at #4 on the UK Albums Chart. The album included two Billboard R&B number-one singles, "Can't Get Enough of Your Love, Babe" and "You're the First, the Last, My Everything". Both were also successful on the Billboard Hot 100, peaking at #1 and #2 respectively. Both singles were also hits on the UK Singles Chart, peaking at #8 and #1 respectively. The album was digitally remastered and reissued on CD on March 19, 1996 by Island/Mercury Records.

Critical reception
Village Voice critic Robert Christgau mockingly wrote: "Inspirational Clichés: 'doin' our own thing,' 'different strokes for different folks,' 'rather fight than switch.' Inspirational Emphases: 'very important,' 'very very very very true,' 'truly truly.' Inspirational Epithet: 'hope-to-die woman.' Inspirational Drum Sound: thwop.'"

In 2003, Rolling Stone ranked the album at number 281 the magazine's list of the 500 greatest albums of all time, and at 283 in a 2012 revised list.

Track listing

Personnel
Barry White - lead vocals, arranger, artwork concept
Gene Page - arranger
Technical
Paul Elmore, Frank Kejmar - engineer
Al Harper - cover painting

Charts

Weekly charts

Year-end charts

Singles

Certifications and sales

See also
List of number-one albums of 1974 (U.S.)
List of number-one R&B albums of 1974 (U.S.)

References

External links
 Can't Get Enough at Discogs

1974 albums
Barry White albums
albums arranged by Gene Page
20th Century Fox Records albums